Rai Coast Rural LLG is a local-level government (LLG) of Madang Province, Papua New Guinea.

Wards
01. Gauss (Bonga), Malalamai, Gali and Bonga. Bonga and Malalamai speak the one language - the Bonga Malalamai language while Gali speak Gali language.
(Yagomi language speakers)
04. Kepolak
05. Baru
06. Mamgak (Forak language and Ronji language speakers)
07. Mur
08. Umboldi
09. Kakimar
10. Saidor
11. Yaimas
12. Waibol
13. Biliau
14. Sibog
15. Suri
16. Bagalawa
17. Lamtup
18. Maibang
19. Yorkia
20. Sari
21. Sorang
22. Kiambaui
23. Matako
24. Gogou
25. Sarakiri
26. Kwongo
27. Wado
28. Simimididi
29. Wongetuo
30. Ganglau
31. Orinma
32. Mebu
33. Batoto
34. Matafun
35. Bok
36. Malala
37. Ward 37
38. Ward 38
39. Ward 39
40. Ward 40
41. Ward 41
42. Ward 42 (Mebu language speakers)

References

Local-level governments of Madang Province